A vow is an oath or promise.

Vow, Vows or The Vow may also refer to:

 The Vow (devolution promise), a joint statement in the 2014 Scottish independence referendum

Books
The Vow, romance novel by Linda Lael Miller (1998)
The Vow, novel by Denene Millner 
The Vow, romance novel by Rebecca Winters (2008)

Film and TV
 The Vow (1946 film), a 1946 Stalinist propaganda film directed by Mikhail Chiaureli
 The Vow (2012 film), a 2012 film directed by Michael Sucsy
 The Vow (TV series), a HBO documentary series
 The Vows, a 1973 film directed by António de Macedo
 The Vow, international title of the Indian soap opera Banoo Main Teri Dulhann 
 "Vows" (Dollhouse), an episode of the American science fiction television series Dollhouse

Music
 Vows (band), American psychedelic band
 Vows (album), a 2011 album by Kimbra

Songs
 "The Vow" (song), a 1983 song by Toyah
 "Vow" (song), a 1994 song by Garbage
 A song by Kutless from the album Kutless

Acronyms 
 VOW Vertrokken onbekend waarheen, a Dutch term meaning "left town, destination unknown", used in Dutch resident registrations

Companies 

 Vow (company), an Australian cultured meat company